Arthur Kneller (28 April 1894 – 19 July 1969) was a cricketer who played first-class cricket for Hampshire County Cricket Club between 1924 and 1926. He was educated at Ardingly College. He was also the Deputy Commissioner of Labour in Kenya. He died in Chichester, Sussex, England in 1969.

References

External links
Career statistics - Arthur Kneller

1894 births
1969 deaths
People educated at Ardingly College
Hampshire cricketers
People from Kingsclere